Tzatziki, also known as tarator  or cacık, is a dip, soup, or sauce found in the cuisines of Southeast Europe and the Middle East. It is made of salted strained yogurt or diluted yogurt mixed with cucumbers, garlic, salt, olive oil, sometimes with vinegar or lemon juice, and herbs such as dill, mint, parsley and thyme. It is served as a cold appetizer (mezze), a side dish, and as a sauce for souvlaki and gyros sandwiches and other foods.

History
Tarator was the name of a dish made of ground walnuts and vinegar in the Ottoman Empire. Dishes of various preparations in the region, including dips, salads, and sauces, acquired the name. In the Levant, taratur is a sauce based on tahini, while in Turkey and the Balkans it came to mean a combination of yogurt and cucumbers, sometimes with walnuts. It has become a traditional part of meze.

Etymology

The word tzatziki appeared in English around the mid-20th century as a loanword from Modern Greek, which in turn comes from the Turkish word . The root is likely related to several words in Western Asian languages. Persian  refers to various herbs used for cooking. That word is combined with the Turkish diminutive suffix -cık to yield cacık. It may be related to an Armenian word, cacıg. According to Sevan Nişanyan the Armenian word may itself come from Turkish or Kurdish. 

Evliya Çelebi's 17th-century travelogue, the Seyahatnâme, defined cacıχ (cacıg) as a kind of herb that is added to food. The modern sense is documented as early as 1876, as a herb salad with yogurt.

The form tarator found in languages from the Balkans to the Levant appears to be of Slavic origin, coming from Bulgaria.

Variations

Greece

Greek-style tzatziki sauce is commonly served as a meze, to be eaten with bread, fried eggplant, or zucchini.

Tzatziki is made of strained yogurt (usually from sheep or goat milk) mixed with cucumbers, garlic, salt, olive oil, and sometimes lemon juice, and dill or mint or parsley.

A variation made with purslane ( in Greek) may be called  meaning "purslane and yogurt salad" rather than tzatziki. One simple recipe calls for purslane, olive oil, red wine vinegar and dill. Another is made with purslane, mint, cilantro, parsley and ground coriander, along with the standard yogurt-cucumber base.

Turkey

Turkish cacık is made by combining a bit of water and yogurt in a deep bowl together with garlic and different combinations of fresh vegetables and herbs. The amount of water used depends on how thick the cook wants the cacık to be—sometimes the dish is served as a cold soup, but it can also be made thicker according to taste. Labneh may be substituted for some of the yogurt. Garlic is crushed in a mortar and pestle together with salt and the cucumbers are either chopped or grated. 

The crushed garlic, yogurt and cucumber are combined thoroughly before the dish is garnished with some combination of aleppo pepper, paprika, sumac or mint. It is especially popular during summer months and may optionally be served with ice.

When shredded carrots are added along with the cucumber it is called havuçlu cacık. In Turkey tarator is also called balkan cacığı and is made with fresh scallions and mint. Other cacık varieties may include shredded radish or chopped red pepper and fresh parsley. Dill can optionally be added as well. Some recipes add fresh basil or a tablespoon of vinegar. One version with basil is made with ground walnuts, hazelnuts and chopped fresh basil.

Not all cacıks are made with shredded cucumber—sometimes various types of leafy greens or herbs are used in combination with other ingredients. For example, one version calls for boiled wheat berry (the same kind used to make Noah's Pudding) and fresh dill. It can also be made into a type of salad with purslane. Sometimes it is made with unripe (green) almonds called çağla in Turkish. It may be also made from wild edible plants like çıtlık and eaten in a wrap called dürüm.

For cacıklı arap köftesi, kofta made from a mix of bulgur and ground meat is served over cacık. In this case the cacık is made with chard rather than the usual cucumber. (Spinach or parsley may be substituted for the chard. Some recipes use purslane.) Bulgurlu madımak cacığı is made with cracked wheat, cucumber and a type of knotweed called madımak.

Balkans

Tarator is found in many Balkan countries. It is often prepared as a cold soup, popular in the summer. It is made of yogurt, cucumber, garlic, walnut, dill, vegetable oil, and water, and is served chilled or even with ice. Local variations may replace yogurt with water and vinegar, omit nuts or dill, or add bread. The cucumbers may on rare occasions be replaced with lettuce or carrots.

A thicker variation is sometimes known as "dry tarator", or as Snezhanka salad, which means "Snow White salad", and is served as an appetizer or side dish. During preparation, the yogurt is hung for several hours in a kerchief and loses about half of its water.  The cucumbers, garlic, minced walnuts, salt and vegetable oil are then added.

In Bulgaria, tarator is a popular meze (appetizer) but is also served as a side dish along with Shopska salad with some meals. Sunflower oil and olive oil are more commonly used, and the walnuts are sometimes omitted. Tarator is seasoned with garlic and dill, both of which can be omitted. It's a popular dish in Bulgaria and a common refresher during the summer.

In Albania, tarator is a very popular dish in the summertime. It is usually served cold and is normally made from yogurt, garlic, parsley, cucumber, salt and olive oil. Fried squid is often offered with Tarator.

Cyprus

It is made from strained yogurt, sliced cucumbers, minced garlic cloves, lemon juice and sprinkled with dried mint, oregano or olive oil.

Middle East
In Iraq, jajeek is often served as meze. It may accompany alcoholic drinks, especially arak, an ouzo-like drink made from dates. In Iran it is known as mast o khiar.

Similar dishes

A variation in the Caucasus mountains, called ovdukh, uses kefir instead of the yogurt. This can be poured over a mixture of vegetables, eggs and ham to create a variation of okroshka, sometimes referred to as a 'Caucasus okroshka'. Mizeria is another variation from Poland, using the same ingredients but substituting sour cream for yogurt.

In South Asia a similar dish is made with yogurt, cucumber, salt and ground cumin (sometimes also including onions) called raita.

In Iran, ash-e doogh is another type of yogurt soup; instead of cucumbers it contains a variety of herbs such as basil, leek, mint, black pepper and raisins. In this style, sometimes dried bread chips, chopped nuts or raisins are put in the dish just before serving.

See also

 Cold borscht
 Dipping sauce#List of common dips
 List of hors d'oeuvre
 List of yogurt-based dishes and beverages
 List of dairy products
 Qatiq
 Raita
 Snow White salad
 Toum

References

External links

Bulgarian cuisine
Cold soups
Cypriot cuisine
Dips (food)
Fermented dairy products
Greek sauces
Greek appetizers
Iranian cuisine
Iraqi cuisine
Levantine cuisine
Meze
Sauces
Turkish soups
Yogurt-based dishes